The 1920 British Columbia general election was the fifteenth general election for the Province of British Columbia, Canada. It was held to elect members of the Legislative Assembly of British Columbia. The election was called on October 23, 1920, and held on December 1, 1920.  The new legislature met for the first time on February 8, 1921.

Although it lost eleven seats in the legislature, and fell from 50% of the popular vote to under 38%, the governing Liberal Party was able to hold on to a slim majority in the legislature for its second consecutive term in government.

The Conservative Party also lost a significant share of its popular vote, but won six additional seats for a total of fifteen, and formed the Official Opposition.

Almost a third of the vote and seven seats were won by independents and by a wide variety of fringe parties.

This was the first general election in which women could vote and run for office.

Results

Notes:

* Party did not nominate candidates in the previous election.

1 Liberals: One member elected by acclamation. One candidate, J. Oliver, who contested and was elected in both Delta and Victoria City is counted twice.

2 Includes Liberty League of B.C., Vancouver Ratepayers Association, and Women's Freedom League candidates.

3 Includes those candidates not directly nominated by, but supported by the Federated Labour Party.

4 Includes the Prince Rupert Labour candidate running on a Socialist Party platform.

5 Sometimes referred to as a triple alliance of "Farmer-Labour-Soldier" with Soldier-Farmer candidates running in rural Districts (five candidates, 3361 votes) and Soldier-Labour candidates running in urban ones (six candidates, 7419 votes).

6 Some GAUV candidates ran on a joint Soldier-Labour ticket.

Results by riding

All districts' elections were held as first past the post, except in Vancouver City (where six seats were filled through block voting) and Victoria City (where four seats were filled through block voting).

|-
|-
||    
|align="center"  |Herbert Frederick Kergin
|align="center"  |Atlin<small>Liberal
||    
||    
|align="center"  |Dewdney<small>Conservative
|align="center"|John Alexander Catherwood
||    
|-
||    
|align="center"  |John MacKay Yorston
|align="center"  |Cariboo<small>Liberal
||    
||    
|align="center"  |Esquimalt<small>Conservative
|align="center"|Robert Henry Pooley
||    
|-
||    
|align="center"  |Edward Dodsley Barrow
|align="center"  |Chilliwack<small>Liberal
||    
||    
|align="center"  |Kaslo<small>Conservative
|align="center"|Fred W. Lister
||    
|-
||    
|align="center"  |John Andrew Buckham
|align="center"  |Columbia<small>Liberal
||    
||    
|align="center"  |Lillooet<small>Conservative
|align="center"|Archibald McDonald
||    
|-
||    
|align="center"  |James Horace King
|align="center"  |Cranbrook<small>Liberal
||    
||    
|align="center"  |Nelson<small>Conservative
|align="center"|William Oliver Rose
||    
|-
||    
|align="center"|John Oliver 
|align="center"  |Delta<small>Liberal
||    
||    
|align="center"  |Richmond<small>Conservative
|align="center"|Thomas Pearson
||    
|-
||    
|align="center"|Henry George Thomas Perry 
|align="center"  |Fort George<small>Liberal
||    
||    
|align="center"  |Rossland<small>Conservative
|align="center"|William Kemble Esling
||    
|-
||    
|align="center"|Ezra Churchill Henniger 
|align="center"  |Grand Forks<small>Liberal
||    
||    
|align="center"  |Similkameen<small>Conservative
|align="center"|William Alexander McKenzie
||    
|-
|-
||    
|align="center"|John Duncan MacLean 
|align="center"  |Greenwood<small>Liberal
||    
||    
|align="center"  |South Okanagan<small>Conservative
|align="center"|James William Jones
||    
|-
||    
|align="center"|Malcolm Bruce Jackson 
|align="center"  |The Islands<small>Liberal
||    
||    
|align="center"  |Trail<small>Conservative
|align="center"|James Hargrave Schofield
||    
|-
||    
|align="center"|Frederick William Anderson 
|align="center"  |Kamloops<small>Liberal
||    
||    
|align="center" |Vancouver City<small>Conservative
|align="center"|William John Bowser
||    
|-
||    
|align="center"|David Whiteside 
|align="center"  |New Westminster<small>Liberal
||    
||    
|align="center"  |Victoria City<small>Conservative
|align="center"|Joshua Hinchcliffe
||    
|-
||    
|align="center"|Frederick Arthur Pauline 
|align="center"  |Saanich<small>Liberal
||    
||    
|align="center"  |Yale<small>Conservative
|align="center"|John McRae
||    
|-
||    
|align="center"|William Hunter 
|align="center"  |Slocan<small>Liberal
||    
||    
|align="center"  |Comox<small>People's Party
|align="center"|Thomas Menzies 
||    
|-
||    
|align="center"|John Wallace deBeque Farris 
|align="center" rowspan=5 |Vancouver City<small>Liberal five out of six seats
||    
||    
|align="center"  |Fernie<small>Federated Labour
|align="center"|Thomas Aubert Uphill
||    
|-
||    
|align="center"|Malcolm Archibald Macdonald 
||    
||    
|align="center"  |Newcastle<small>Federated Labour
|align="center"|Samuel Guthrie
||    
|-
||    
|align="center"|Ian Alistair MacKenzie 
||    
||    
|align="center"  |South Vancouver<small>Federated Labour
|align="center"|Robert Henry Neelands
||    
|-
||    
|align="center"|James Ramsay 
||    
||    
|align="center"  |Alberni<small>Independent
|align="center"|Richard John Burde 
||    
|-
||    
|align="center"|Mary Ellen Smith 
||    
||    
|align="center"  |Cowichan<small>Independent
|align="center"|Kenneth Forrest Duncan 
||    
|-
||    
|align="center"|William Sloan 
|align="center"  |Nanaimo<small>Liberal
||    
||    
|align="center"  |North Vancouver<small>Independent
|align="center"|George Samuel Hanes
||    
|-
||    
|align="center"|Kenneth Cattanach MacDonald 
|align="center"  |North Okanagan<small>Liberal
||    
|-
||    
|align="center"|Alexander Malcolm Manson 
|align="center"  |Omineca<small>Liberal
||    
|-
||    
|align="center"|Thomas Dufferin Pattullo 
|align="center"  |Prince Rupert<small>Liberal
||    
|-
||    
|align="center"|William Henry Sutherland 
|align="center"  |Revelstoke<small>Liberal
||    
|-
||    
|align="center"|Joseph Badenoch Clearihue 
|align="center" rowspan=3 |Victoria City<small>Liberal three out of four seats
||    
|-
||    
|align="center"|John Hart 
||    
|-
||    
|align="center"|John Oliver 1 
||    
|-
|-
|
|align="center"|1 Incumbent and Premier-Elect
|
|-
| align="center" colspan="10"|Source:' Elections BC
|-
|}

See also
List of British Columbia political parties

Notes

Further reading & referencesIn the Sea of Sterile Mountains: The Chinese in British Columbia'', Joseph Morton, J.J. Douglas, Vancouver (1974).  Despite its title, a fairly thorough account of the politicians and electoral politics in early BC.

References

1920
1920 elections in Canada
1920 in British Columbia
December 1920 events in Canada